Sheikh Ahmad bin Rashid Al Mualla (1902 - 1981) was a ruler of the emirate of Umm Al Quwain, United Arab Emirates from 1929 to 1981. He is the father of Sheikh Rashid bin Ahmad Al Mualla II. He assumed his position after the assassination of his cousin, Sheikh Hamad bin Ibrahim Al Mualla in 1929. In his old age, the emirate joined the federation of the UAE in 1971. The first school and hospital in the emirate was established in his time.

References

1902 births
1981 deaths
History of the United Arab Emirates
Sheikhs of Umm Al Quwain
20th-century Emirati people